Kalisham (also Romanized as Kelīshom and Kelīshom; also known as Kel-e-Qum and Kilishum) is a village in Kelishom Rural District, Amarlu District, Rudbar County, Gilan Province, Iran. At the 2006 census, its population was 704, in 224 families.

References 

Populated places in Rudbar County